Camper Van Beethoven is an American rock band formed in Redlands, California in 1983, later based in Santa Cruz and San Francisco. Their style mixes elements of pop, ska, punk rock, folk, alternative country, and world music. The band initially polarized audiences within the hardcore punk scene of California's Inland Empire and then found wider acceptance and, eventually, an international audience. Their strong iconoclasm and emphasis on do-it-yourself values proved influential to the burgeoning indie rock movement.

The band's first three independent records were released within an 18-month period. Their debut single was "Take the Skinheads Bowling". The group signed to Virgin Records in 1987, released two albums and enjoyed chart success with their 1989 cover of Status Quo's "Pictures of Matchstick Men", a number one hit on Billboard Magazine'''s Modern Rock Tracks. They disbanded the following year due to internal tensions.
  
Lead singer David Lowery formed Cracker, David Immerglück joined Counting Crows, and several other members played in Monks of Doom. Beginning in 1999, the former members reunited and made several new records.

History
Formative and early years (1983–1985)
Camper Van Beethoven was preceded by several related garage bands based in Redlands, including Sitting Duck and the Estonian Gauchos (featuring future Cracker guitarist Johnny Hickman). These bands included future Camper Van Beethoven members bassist and vocalist David Lowery, guitarist and multi-instrumentalist Chris Molla, and often drummer Bill McDonald as well. The Estonian Gauchos and a late incarnation of Sitting Duck also included another future Camper Van Beethoven member, bassist Victor Krummenacher, whose joining allowed Lowery to switch to rhythm guitar. Sitting Ducks played a mixture of punk and acid rock, along with what Lowery described as "fake Russian-sounding music". At the same time, Lowery, Molla and Krummenacher were studying in Santa Cruz at the University of California, Santa Cruz, and were musically active there as well. The former two played in the Santa Cruz-based Box O' Laffs, which also included future Camper Van Beethoven members Richie West, Anthony Guess, and Chris Pedersen at various times.

While on summer break in 1983, Lowery and Molla returned to Redlands and formed a new band, Camper Van Beethoven and the Border Patrol. The group featured Lowery, Molla, Krummenacher and McDonald, along with several other musicians at various points, including guitarist David McDaniel, harmonica player Mike Zorn and violinist Daniel Blume. Although this initial incarnation of the band only existed for three months, during this time they wrote much of the material which would feature on their debut album, including "Take the Skinheads Bowling". The band's name was coined by McDaniel: according to Lowery "McDaniel was into this stuff that would sound like it made sense, but really it didn’t... He’d watch a lot of TV, accept all this mass-media stuff and spit it out all chopped up. I got the whole absurdism influence from him".

When Lowery, Molla and Krummenacher returned to college in Santa Cruz, Lowery and Molla resumed playing with Box O' Laffs. After meeting violinist, keyboardist and guitarist Jonathan Segel, they decided to re-form Camper Van Beethoven and the Border Patrol in Santa Cruz, with drummer Richie West replacing McDonald.

First three albums (1985–1987)
In 1985, the band reduced its name to Camper Van Beethoven, replaced West with Anthony Guess, and recorded their debut album, Telephone Free Landslide Victory. The record featured their first successful single, "Take the Skinheads Bowling", the lesser hit "The Day That Lassie Went to the Moon", and an experimental country-influenced cover version of Black Flag's "Wasted". The album featured songs with humorous lyrics, often simultaneously celebrating and mocking 1980s counterculture, and instrumental tracks featuring ska-beats and Eastern European, Mexican or Spaghetti-Western influenced guitar or violin lines.

Shortly after this record was released, lead guitarist Greg Lisher joined the group. The band recorded a set of songs with an expanded version of the lineup that recorded the debut, with Lisher playing lead on some songs. Guess departed shortly thereafter, leaving Lowery and Molla briefly to take turns swapping drumming duties. This incarnation recorded a second set of songs, with Molla handling the drums. At the end of the sessions, in 1986, long-term drummer Chris Pedersen was added.

The band's second album, II & III, was culled from both recording sessions. Segel played mandolin and sitar in addition to violin, and Molla played pedal steel guitar on some tracks. The album featured a noticeably expanded sound, with influences of country music and Americana mixed in with faux Indian or Arabic music and psychedelia.

Released later that year, their self-titled third album featured guest membership from experimental banjo and guitar player Eugene Chadbourne on their cover of Pink Floyd's "Interstellar Overdrive" and several other tracks. On the album, the elements of psychedelia on the previous album came to the fore. The album also featured some satirical political commentary on songs like "Good Guys and Bad Guys" and "Joe Stalin's Cadillac," the former which enjoyed some underground college radio play. Krummenacher, Lisher, Pedersen and Molla also formed the side project Monks of Doom, although Molla was quickly replaced by guitarist David Immerglück.

Molla left Camper Van Beethoven after touring for the third album, reducing the band to a five-piece with Lowery, Krummenacher, Segel, Lisher, and Pedersen — the longest-standing lineup in their initial career. Released in November 1987, the EP Vampire Can Mating Oven preceded a major label bidding war. The EP featured a more streamlined and accessible sound, with Lisher's lead guitar taking a major role for the first time.

Virgin Records years (1987–1990)
In 1987 the band signed to Virgin Records. They released their fourth album Our Beloved Revolutionary Sweetheart. The album featured a more streamlined, song-oriented approach, cutting back on the psychedelia and reducing the number of instrumentals, but keeping much of their eclectic approach.   This was followed by extensive touring and preparations for recording their next album.

Due to internal tensions, Segel left the band during rehearsals for their fifth album. Written mostly as a four-piece, the resultant LP, Key Lime Pie, featured the violin playing of Don Lax before the replacement violinist Morgan Fichter (of the Bay Area band Harm Farm) was found. Fichter played violin on Opening Theme, Pictures of Matchstick Men and Flowers. The album featured a noticeably darker lyrical outlook as compared to the band's previous records. Musically, it featured less of the world-music influences of the previous albums, replaced with more elements of Americana, along with a lusher, a more orchestrated version of psychedelia than their previous records had featured. They scored a minor hit with a cover of the Status Quo song "Pictures of Matchstick Men", their highest-charting single.

David Immerglück (of the Ophelias and the Monks of Doom) joined in 1990 for touring behind the record, playing some of the departed Molla and Segel's instrumental parts on steel guitar, guitar and mandolin. They broke up in April 1990 after a show in Örebro, Sweden.

Inactive period (1990–1999)Camper Vantiquities, a compilation album packaging the Vampire Can Mating Oven EP with outtakes, demos, and rarities, was released in 1993.

After disbanding, Lowery and Hickman formed Cracker with bassist Davey Faragher. Krummenacher, Lisher, Immerglück and Pedersen intensified their activities in Monks of Doom, which remained active until 1993. These members also collaborated with Chadbourne under the name Camper Van Chadbourne. Immerglück later collaborated with Counting Crows, officially joining the group in 1999. Krummenacher began a solo career, recording several solo albums with guests such as Dave Alvin. Pedersen moved to Australia in 1998.

Segel played with Dieselhed and Sparklehorse, and fronted his own bands Hieronymus Firebrain and Jack & Jill, later playing under his own name. He later became involved in experimental and electronic music, including collaborations with Fred Frith and Joelle Leandre, and Chaos Butterfly, an electro-acoustic duo with Dina Emerson. Segel and Krummenacher also ran their own record label, Magnetic Motorworks.

Reunion; Tusk (1999–2004)
In 1999, Lowery, Segel, and Krummenacher regrouped in the studio to assemble the experimental rarity set Camper Van Beethoven Is Dead. Long Live Camper Van Beethoven, which also contained newly recorded material. Segel and Krummenacher, along with Greg Lisher, also joined Cracker for a tour, playing a set of Camper songs for a section of the set, backed by drummer Frank Funaro and other Cracker members.

In 2002, the group played its first proper live shows in twelve years. With Lowery, Segel, Krummenacher and Lisher forming the core of the reunited lineup, two New York dates also featured Immerglück and two members of Cracker, drummer Frank Funaro and keyboardist Kenny Margolis. Three California dates omitted these latter three musicians and saw Pedersen return to the kit.

Also in 2002, they released the double-CD Tusk, a re-recording of the entire Fleetwood Mac album of the same name. Although initially announced as a rediscovery of a series of 1987 demos, the album was recorded in 2001 by Lowery, Segel, Krummenacher and Lisher as an experiment to see if the members could now work together. Extensive touring, mostly with Margolis and Funaro, followed.

The group next released Cigarettes & Carrot Juice: The Santa Cruz Years, a five-disc box set compiling their first three (pre-Virgin) albums, Camper Vantiquities, and a live recording from 1990 they called Greatest Hits Played Faster. The latter recording featured live versions of several unreleased songs. Shortly thereafter, the band released "director's cut" versions of the first three records and Camper Vantiquities, which included remastering, re-sequencing and additional demo and B-side tracks.

New Roman Times; live and compilation releases (2004–2012)
In 2004, the band released New Roman Times, their first studio album of original material in 15 years. A concept album, the record detailed the rise and fall of an idealistic Texan whose disenchantment following a stint with the American military redirected him towards organized terrorism. It featured the band's familiar eclectic sound, but also added a heavier, prog-metal sound on a few tracks. The lineup on the album included Lowery, Krummenacher, Segel, Lisher, Pedersen and Immergluck. The album also featured contributions by other Camper Van Beethoven associates, including Molla and Hickman. Following the album's release, Pedersen and Immergluck did not participate in the touring lineup, and Funaro started to handle all of the drumming in live shows.

A limited-edition live concert disc was also released, In the Mouth of the Crocodile – Live in Seattle. Segments of a 2004 performance were released the following year as Discotheque CVB: Live in Chicago.

The band continued to frequently tour with Cracker (whom Krummenacher joined for a time), and in 2005 the two groups started an annual three-night "Campout" at Pappy and Harriet's Pioneertown Palace in Pioneertown, California. The Campout has seen appearances by Built to Spill, Neko Case, Magnolia Electric Company, and John Doe, as well as sets from the individual members of the band.

A compilation of greatest hits, Popular Songs of Great Enduring Strength and Beauty, was released by Cooking Vinyl Records in June 2008. As band relations with Virgin Records were poor, they were not granted access to any material from the two Virgin LPs for this compilation. Thus, the band re-recorded five songs from these albums to include on the collection. These were the first and only Camper Van Beethoven studio tracks to include Funaro.

In 2011, the band began playing a series of shows that featured the Key Lime Pie record in its entirety, often joined by Immergluck. In the same year, they also revealed plans for a new album.

La Costa Perdida and El Camino Real (2013–present)La Costa Perdida, the followup to New Roman Times, was released on January 22, 2013, preceded by the single "Northern California Girls". The music was inspired in part by Holland-era Beach Boys. Most of the drumming on the album was by studio drummer and former Cracker member Michael Urbano, although Chris Pederson played on some tracks as well. Much of the album featured a gentler, more folky sound than their previous albums.

Lowery revealed in interviews that there were seven songs recorded during the sessions for La Costa Perdida that were not released, which would be included on a follow-up album to be finished in 2013. In August 2013, the band revealed on its Facebook page that it was tracking songs for the album, with Urbano on drums again. The band stated that the album would be a Southern California-themed sequel to the Northern California theme of La Costa Perdida. On March 2, 2014, the band announced a title for the new album, El Camino Real, which was released on June 3, 2014, in the United States and on June 23, 2014, in the UK. In contrast to the previous album, it featured some of the band's most abrasive and intense music, mixing elements of prog-rock and punk with the band's trademark eclecticism.

For subsequent tour dates, the band initially alternated Pedersen and Urbano on drums, due to health problems that have prevented Frank Funaro from playing. Since 2015, Chris Pedersen has been flying in from Australia to participate in the band's infrequent tours, resulting in a reunion of their best-known late 80's lineup. David Immerglück also continues to join the band's lineup for occasional shows.

Band members

Current members
 David Lowery – lead vocals, rhythm guitar, keyboards, bass, drums (1983–1990, 1999–present)
 Victor Krummenacher – bass, baritone guitar, vocals, occasional lead vocals (1983–1990, 1999–present)
 Jonathan Segel – violin, guitar, keyboards, sitar, mandolin, vocals, occasional lead vocals (1984–1989, 1999–present)
 Greg Lisher – lead guitar, backup vocals (1985–1990, 1999–present)
 Chris Pedersen – drums, backup vocals (1986–1990, 2004, 2015–present; 2002–2014 part-time)

Part-time members:
 David Immerglück – guitar, lap steel guitar, mandolin, bass, backup vocals (1990; 2004, 2000-2003/2005–present part-time)
 Michael Urbano – drums  (2011–present in studio, occasional live dates)

Former members
 Chris Molla – guitar, pedal steel, keyboards, drums, vocals (1983–1986; 2002–2004 part-time)
 David McDaniel – guitar (1983–1984)
 Bill McDonald – drums (1983–1984)
 Mike Zorn – harmonica (1983–1984)
 Daniel Blume – violin (1983–1984)
 Richie West – drums (1984)
 Anthony Guess – drums (1985)
 Eugene Chadbourne – guitar, banjo (1986, studio sessions only)
 Don Lax – violin (1989, studio sessions only)
 Morgan Fichter – violin, vocals (1989–1990)
 Frank Funaro – drums, backup vocals (2000–2004 as guest, 2004–2013 as member, mostly for live dates)
 Kenny Margolis – keyboards, accordion (2000–2006 as guest)

Discography

Studio albums
 Telephone Free Landslide Victory (1985)
 II & III (1986)
 Camper Van Beethoven (1986)
 Our Beloved Revolutionary Sweetheart (1988)
 Key Lime Pie (1989)
 Tusk (2002)
 New Roman Times (2004)
 La Costa Perdida (2013)
 El Camino Real (2014)

EPs and singles
 Take the Skinheads Bowling (1986) - single
 Vampire Can Mating Oven (1987) - EP
 "Turquoise Jewelry" (1988)
 "Life Is Grand" (1988)
 "Pictures of Matchstick Men" (1990)
 "The History of Utah" (live) (2004) – split single with Calexico

Live albums
 In the Mouth of the Crocodile – Live in Seattle (2004) – live album
 Discotheque CVB: Live In Chicago (2005) – live EP

Compilations
 Camper Vantiquities (1993) – rarities compilation
 Camper Van Beethoven Is Dead. Long Live Camper Van Beethoven (2000) – rarities compilation
 Cigarettes & Carrot Juice: The Santa Cruz Years (2002) – boxed set
 Popular Songs of Great Enduring Strength and Beauty (2008) – greatest hits compilation

Various artist compilations
 Look at All the Love We Found (2005) – Sublime tribute album
 The Sandinista! Project (2007) - The Clash tribute album
 Sharknado 3: Oh Hell No!'' (2015) film soundtrack

References

External links

 Official web page
 Audio recordings at the Live Music Archive
 Interview with Crawdaddy!

Alternative rock groups from California
Musical groups established in 1983
I.R.S. Records artists
Rough Trade Records artists
Musical groups from San Francisco
Musical groups disestablished in 1990
Musical groups reestablished in 1999